Hubei Township is a township under the administration of Shenchi County in Shanxi, China. , it has five villages under its administration:
Hubei Village
Shankoushang Village
Shankou Village
Tangjian Village
Ximaojiazao Village

References 

Township-level divisions of Shanxi
Shenchi County